InterVideo was a software publisher specializing in multimedia-related programs. InterVideo's products include video capturing, video editing, DVD authoring, CD/DVD recording, film distribution, and video playback. Its best known product was WinDVD. InterVideo marketed its products to the retail market as well as to Original Equipment Manufacturers. The company was headquartered in Fremont, California.

InterVideo HandHeld Business Unit developed multimedia software solutions in the mobile and embedded multimedia market. Their unique iMobi technologies are embedded widely on Smartphones, GPS units, car entertainment solutions and portable entertainment devices.

History
On 13 August 2005, InterVideo acquired Ulead Systems for approximately $68 million and announced its merger with Ulead on July 9, 2006.

On 28 August 2006, Corel Corporation announced that it would acquire InterVideo for about $196 million.

Closure
On December 12, 2006, Corel announced the acquisition of InterVideo and Ulead had been completed. The InterVideo brand name has been retired, with all former InterVideo products now marketed as Corel or Ulead.

References

See also
WinDVD
Corel Corporation
Ulead Systems

Defunct software companies of the United States
Software companies established in 1998
Software companies disestablished in 2006
Companies formerly listed on the Nasdaq
Defunct companies based in the San Francisco Bay Area
Corel
2006 mergers and acquisitions